Ford City is a census-designated place (CDP) in Kern County, California, United States. The population was 4,348 at the 2020 census, up from 4,278 at the 2010 census. It is immediately north of Taft, between the huge Midway-Sunset Oil Field to the southwest, and the almost exhausted Buena Vista Oil Field to the northeast. State Route 119 passes east of town from its junction with SR 33 to the south.

Geography

History
Originally an oil boom town, the place was named after Ford Motor Company due to the abundance of Ford Model T cars there.

Demographics

2010
At the 2010 census Ford City had a population of 4,298. The racial makeup of Ford City was 2,735 (63.9%) White, 28 (0.7%) African American, 153 (3.6%) Native American, 36 (0.8%) Asian, 32 (0.7%) Pacific Islander, 1,113 (26.0%) from other races, and 181 (4.2%) from two or more races. Hispanic or Latino of any race were 1,971 persons (46.1%).

The whole population lived in households, no one lived in non-institutionalized group quarters and no one was institutionalized.

There were 1,260 households, 596 (47.3%) had children under the age of 18 living in them, 607 (48.2%) were opposite-sex married couples living together, 189 (15.0%) had a female householder with no husband present, 148 (11.7%) had a male householder with no wife present.  There were 138 (11.0%) unmarried opposite-sex partnerships, and 4 (0.3%) same-sex married couples or partnerships. 242 households (19.2%) were one person and 94 (7.5%) had someone living alone who was 65 or older. The average household size was 3.40.  There were 944 families (74.9% of households); the average family size was 3.76.

The age distribution was 1,351 people (31.6%) under the age of 18, 622 people (14.5%) aged 18 to 24, 1,182 people (27.6%) aged 25 to 44, 772 people (18.0%) aged 45 to 64, and 351 people (8.2%) who were 65 or older.  The median age was 27.4 years. For every 100 females, there were 110.1 males.  For every 100 females age 18 and over, there were 113.0 males.

There were 1,426 housing units at an average density of 929.2 per square mile, of the occupied units 620 (49.2%) were owner-occupied and 640 (50.8%) were rented. The homeowner vacancy rate was 2.8%; the rental vacancy rate was 5.3%.  1,843 people (43.1% of the population) lived in owner-occupied housing units and 2,435 people (56.9%) lived in rental housing units.

2000
At the 2000 census there were 3,512 people, 1,241 households, and 882 families living in the CDP. The racial makeup of the CDP was 80.50% White, 0.63% Black or African American, 1.82% Native American, 1.28% Asian, 0.63% Pacific Islander, 11.62% from other races, and 3.53% from two or more races.  21.95% of the population were Hispanic or Latino of any race.
Of the 1,241 households 35.9% had children under the age of 18 living with them, 49.2% were married couples living together, 14.4% had a female householder with no husband present, and 28.9% were non-families. 24.6% of households were one person and 10.5% were one person aged 65 or older.  The average household size was 2.83 and the average family size was 3.28.

The age distribution was 31.4% under the age of 18, 10.9% from 18 to 24, 28.0% from 25 to 44, 17.5% from 45 to 64, and 12.2% 65 or older.  The median age was 30 years. For every 100 females, there were 97.3 males.  For every 100 females age 18 and over, there were 98.3 males.

The median household income was $25,192 and the median family income  was $30,256. Males had a median income of $34,474 versus $20,625 for females. The per capita income for the CDP was $11,581.  About 30.5% of families and 31.3% of the population were below the poverty line, including 36.7% of those under age 18 and 7.5% of those age 65 or over.

References

Census-designated places in Kern County, California
Census-designated places in California